Francis William George Gore  (22 June 1855 – 17 July 1938) was an English first-class cricketer and British Army officer.

The son of the Reverend George Gore and his wife, Frances Anne Rous, he was born in Somerset at Newton St Loe. He was educated at Harrow School, before going up to Christ Church, Oxford. Gore was also a student of the Inner Temple, but was never called to the bar. He made a single appearance in first-class cricket when he played for I Zingari against Yorkshire in the Scarborough Festival of 1881. Batting twice in the match, he was dismissed without scoring by Edmund Peate in the I Zingari first-innings, while in their second-innings of 236 all out he was unbeaten without scoring. He married Lady Constance Grace Milles, the daughter of George Milles, 1st Earl Sondes, in October 1885. He served as the deputy lieutenant of Monmouthshire in 1889–90. 

Gore later served in the Second Boer War with the North Somerset Yeomanry, holding the rank of lieutenant in April 1900, with promotion to the rank of captain coming in January 1901. He was promoted to the rank of major the following April. Gore later transferred to the City of London Yeomanry in April 1908, with promotion to the honorary rank of lieutenant colonel coming shortly before his transfer in March 1908. Gore served in the First World War, obtaining the full rank of lieutenant colonel in November 1914, before reverting shortly after at his own request to the rank of major and honorary lieutenant colonel. He was again promoted to the rank of lieutenant colonel in January 1917, antedated to June 1916. He retired from active service in February 1920, having reached the age limit for service, at which point he was decorated with the Territorial Decoration. He also served during his life as a justice of the peace for Glamorgan. Gore died in July 1938 at Victoria, London. He was survived by his wife and three of their four children. His brothers-in-law, Henry Milles and George Milles-Lade, both played first-class cricket.

References

External links

1855 births
1938 deaths
People from Bath and North East Somerset
People educated at Harrow School
Alumni of Christ Church, Oxford
English cricketers
I Zingari cricketers
Deputy Lieutenants of Monmouthshire
British Army personnel of the Second Boer War
North Somerset Yeomanry officers
City of London Yeomanry (Rough Riders) officers
British Army personnel of World War I
English justices of the peace
Military personnel from Somerset